was a feudal domain under the Tokugawa shogunate of Edo period Japan, located in Tanba Province in what is now the west-central portion of modern-day Kyoto Prefecture. It was centered around Yamaga jin'ya in what is now the Hirose neighborhood of the city of Ayabe, Kyoto.

History
The Tani clan was originally from Mino Province and were early retainers of Oda Nobunaga. Tani Moritomo participated in all of the campaigns of Toyotomi Hideyoshi and was rewarded with a 16,000 koku domain in Tanba Province in 1582. During the Battle of Sekigahara, he served in the Western Army, and was ordered by Ishida Mitsunari to attack Tanabe Castle, whose lord, Hosokawa Fujitaka was a personal friend. Tani made a great show of attacking the castle, but famously, all of his soldiers and cannons were firing blank rounds at the castle. For this reason, he received no punishment from the victorious Tokugawa Ieyasu and was confirmed as daimyō of his existing holdings under the Tokugawa shogunate. He went on to serve the Tokugawa at the Siege of Osaka. The clan would continue to rule Yamaga for 13 generations until the Meiji restoration. However, Tani Moritomo's son, Tani Morimasa, distributed 6000 koku of his holdings to his younger brother and two cousins, reducing the domain to the bare minimum requirement to maintain its status. Since the domain was located in a mountainous area with little land suitable for rice cultivation, the domain's finances were supported by forestry and production of washi paper. During the Bakumatsu period, the domain was one of the first to support the new Meiji government.  In 1871, with the abolition of the han system, Yamaga briefly became "Yamaga Prefecture", which was merged with Kyoto Prefecture a few months later. The final daimyō, Tani Morishige, became a viscount (shishaku) in the kazoku peerage in 1884.

Holdings at the end of the Edo period
As with most domains in the han system, Yamaga Domain consisted of several discontinuous territories calculated to provide the assigned kokudaka, based on periodic cadastral surveys and projected agricultural yields. 

Tanba Province 
44 villages in Ikaruga District

List of daimyō 

{| class=wikitable
! #||Name || Tenure || Courtesy title || Court Rank || kokudaka
|-
|colspan=6|  Tani clan, 1582-1871 (tozama)
|-
||1||||1582 – 1627||Dewa-no-kami (出羽守)|| Junior 5th Rank, Lower Grade (従五位下) ||16,000 koku
|-
||2||||1628 – 1662||Daigaku-no-kami (大学頭)|| Junior 5th Rank, Lower Grade (従五位下)||16,000 -> 10,000 koku
|-
||3||||1663 – 1689||Dewa-no-kami (出羽守)|| Junior 5th Rank, Lower Grade (従五位下)||10,000 koku
|-
||4||||1689 – 1717||Harima-no-kami  (播磨守)|| Junior 5th Rank, Lower Grade (従五位下)||10,000 koku
|-
||5||||1717 – 1762||Dewa-no-kami  出羽守)|| Junior 5th Rank, Lower Grade (従五位下)||10,000 koku
|-
||6||||1762 – 1764||Daigaku-no-kami (大学頭)|| Junior 5th Rank, Lower Grade (従五位下)||10,000 koku
|-
||7||||1764 – 1780||Harima-no-kami (播磨守)|| Junior 5th Rank, Lower Grade (従五位下)||10,000 koku
|-
||8||||1780 – 1801||Harima-no-kami (播磨守)|| Junior 5th Rank, Lower Grade (従五位下)||10,000 koku
|-
||9||||1801 – 1816||Daigaku-no-kami (大学頭)|| Junior 5th Rank, Lower Grade (従五位下)||10,000 koku
|-
||10||||1816 – 1820||Ukyo-no-suke (右京亮)|| Junior 5th Rank, Lower Grade (従五位下)||10,000 koku
|-
||11||||1820 – 1845||Dewa-no-kami  出羽守)|| Junior 5th Rank, Lower Grade (従五位下)||10,000 koku
|-
||12||||1845 – 1856||Harima-no-kami  播磨守)|| Junior 5th Rank, Lower Grade (従五位下)||10,000 koku
|-
||13||||1856 – 1871||Daizen-no-suke (大膳亮)|| Junior 5th Rank, Lower Grade (従五位下)||10,000 koku
|-
|}

See also 
 List of Han
 Abolition of the han system

Further reading
 Bolitho, Harold. (1974). Treasures Among Men: The Fudai Daimyo in Tokugawa Japan. New Haven: Yale University Press.  ;  OCLC 185685588
 Genealogy of the Aoyama clan 
 Japan Gazette (1912). Peerage of Japan. n.p.
 Papinot, Edmond (1972). Historical and Geographical Dictionary of Japan. Vermont: Tuttle.
 Tsukahira, Toshio George (1966). Feudal Control in Tokugawa Japan: The Sankin Kōtai System. Boston: Harvard University Press.

References

Domains of Japan
1871 disestablishments in Japan
States and territories disestablished in 1871
Tanba Province
History of Kyoto Prefecture